There are five types of elections in England: elections to the House of Commons of the United Kingdom, elections to the devolved London Assembly, local council elections, metro mayor elections, and the Police and crime commissioner elections, in addition to by-elections for each aforementioned election. Elections are held on Election Day, which is conventionally a Thursday.

Under the Fixed-term Parliaments Act 2011, all five types of elections are held after fixed periods, though early elections to the UK parliament occurred in both 2017 and 2019. After winning the 2019 election, the Conservative Party committed to repealing the FTPA. On 1 December 2020, in fulfilment of this manifesto pledge, the government published a draft Fixed-term Parliaments Act 2011 (Repeal) Bill, which would repeal the FTPA and revive the royal prerogative power of dissolving Parliament as it existed before the Act. The legislation was formally announced as the Dissolution and Calling of Parliament Bill in the Queen's Speech of 11 May 2021, and granted Royal Assent on 24 March 2022.

The three electoral systems used for elections in England are: first-past-the-post (for UK elections and local elections, though individual local authorities are able to move to STV under recent legislation), the additional member system (for Mayor and London Assembly elections) and the supplementary vote (for Police and Crime Commissioner elections; although proposals by the UK Government to change Assembly, Mayor and PCC elections to FPTP have been made).

UK Parliament
Since 1918, the Conservative Party has predominantly received the most English votes in UK general elections, winning a plurality 21 times out of 28. The other seven elections (1945, 1950, 1951, 1966, October 1974, 1997 and 2001) saw the popular vote in England being won by the Labour Party.

1918

1922

1923

1924

1929

1931

1935

1945

1950

1951

1955

1959

1964

1966

1970

February 1974

October 1974

1979

1983

1987

1992

1997

2001

2005

2010

2015

2017

2019

Note: the above figures include the Speaker being counted in the Labour totals, despite the Speaker being non-partisan.

London mayor

The mayor of London is elected by the supplementary vote method for a fixed term of four years, with elections taking place in May. As with most elected posts in the United Kingdom, there is a deposit (in this case of £10,000), which is returnable on the candidate's winning of at least 5% of the first-choice votes cast.

See also 
 Elections in the United Kingdom
 Elections in Northern Ireland
 Elections in Scotland
 Elections in Wales

References